At the Cafe Bohemia, Vol. 2 is a 1956 live album release by the Jazz Messengers. It was first released by Blue Note Records. This record featured the original incarnation of The Jazz Messengers, one of Art Blakey's most endearing bands, and was the second of two volumes recorded at Café Bohemia, a famous night club in Greenwich Village in New York, New York on November 23, 1955.

Reception

This album, which sees the first version of The Jazz Messengers on record, was noted as not "match[ing] the intensity which the quintet secured at Birdland." Tenor saxophonist Hank Mobley, in particular, is noted as "a somewhat unfocused stylist." However, trumpeter Kenny Dorham is seen as an "elusive brilliance [that] was seldom so extensively captured" and the playing in general "is just as absorbing" as the Birdland albums and has "influenced jazz up to present time."

With the July 31, 2001 CD re-issue, three additional tracks from this night were added: "Just One for Those Things", "Hank´s Symphony" and "Gone With The Wind".

Track listing

Personnel
Art Blakey — drums
Kenny Dorham — trumpet
Hank Mobley — tenor saxophone
Horace Silver — piano
Doug Watkins — bass

Production
Bob Bluementhal, Leonard Feather — liner notes
Michael Cuscuna — reissue producer
John Hermansader — cover design
Alfred Lion — producer
Rudy Van Gelder — digital remastering
Francis Wolff — photography

References

Albums produced by Alfred Lion
Albums produced by Michael Cuscuna
Art Blakey live albums
The Jazz Messengers live albums
1956 live albums
Blue Note Records live albums
Albums recorded at the Café Bohemia
Sequel albums